Alfred John Rogers (born April 10, 1953) is a Canadian former professional ice hockey player who played 14 games in the National Hockey League for the Minnesota North Stars during the 1973–74 and 1974–75 seasons. He also played 44 games in the World Hockey Association with the Edmonton Oilers during the 1975–76 season.

Rogers was born in Paradise Hill, Saskatchewan and raised in Frenchman Butte, Saskatchewan.

Career statistics

Regular season and playoffs

External links
 

1953 births
Living people
Canadian ice hockey right wingers
Edmonton Oil Kings (WCHL) players
Edmonton Oilers (WHA) draft picks
Edmonton Oilers (WHA) players
Ice hockey people from Saskatchewan
Minnesota North Stars draft picks
Minnesota North Stars players
New Haven Nighthawks players
Western International Hockey League players